Kranthiyogi Basavanna is a 1983 Indian Kannada-language film, directed by K. S. L. Swamy (Ravee). The film stars Ashok, Aarathi, Srinivasa Murthy, Manjula, Hema Chowdhary. The film has musical score by M. Ranga Rao.
This movie is about life of one of the greatest social reformer of India Vishwa Guru Basavanna. He is the founder of Lingayat religion. Basavanna was first on earth to come up with idea of a parliament. In 12th century, Basavanna formed the first parliament in the world called "Anubhava Mantapa" (Kannada: ಅನುಭವ ಮಂಟಪ).

Cast

Ashok as Kayaka Yogi Basavanna
Aarathi as Gangambike, Basavanna's First Wife
Manjula as Neelambike, Basavanna's Second Wife
Srinivasa Murthy as King Bijjalla
Hema Choudhary as Bijjalla's Wife
Vajramuni as Manchanna
Prabhakar in Guest Appearance
Bharathi in Guest Appearance as Akka Mahadevi
Rajesh in Guest Appearance as Allama Prabhu
Manju Bhargavi in Guest Appearance
Musuri Krishnamurthy in Guest Appearance as Guru of Gurukula
Sudheer
Shashikala
Vasudeva Rao as Haralayya
Doddanna as Maduvarasa
Baby Rekha as Child Basava
Chandrashekar as Channa Basavanna
Shivaram

Soundtrack
The music was composed by M. Ranga Rao.

References

1983 films
1980s Kannada-language films
Films scored by M. Ranga Rao
Films directed by K. S. L. Swamy